EgeTrans Arena is a multi-purpose arena in Bietigheim-Bissingen, Germany. Its tenant is SG BBM Bietigheim.

Events
 2017 World Women's Handball Championship

References

Indoor arenas in Germany
Indoor ice hockey venues in Germany
Handball venues in Germany
Sports venues completed in 2012
2012 establishments in Germany